The Gauley River is a  river in West Virginia. It merges with the New River to form the Kanawha River, a tributary of the Ohio River. The river features numerous recreational whitewater areas, including those in Gauley River National Recreation Area downstream of the Summersville Dam.

Headwaters and course
The Gauley rises in the Monongahela National Forest on Gauley Mountain in Pocahontas County as three streams, the North, Middle, and South Forks, each of which flows across the southern extremity of Randolph County; they converge in Webster County.  The river then flows generally west-southwestwardly through Webster, Nicholas and Fayette counties, past the towns of Camden-on-Gauley and Summersville, to the town of Gauley Bridge, where it joins the New River to form the Kanawha River.  Via the Kanawha and Ohio rivers, it is part of the Mississippi River watershed.

Tributaries
The Gauley's largest tributaries all flow into the main river from the east (flowing in a westerly direction) and are described as follows:

The Williams River drains a segment of the Monongahela National Forest, joining the Gauley in rural Webster County.
The Cranberry River also flows through the Monongahela National Forest and empties into the Gauley in rural Nicholas County.
The Cherry River, which initially flows through the town of Richwood, joins the Gauley near Craigsville.
The Meadow River, which initially flows through the town of Rainelle, joins the Gauley at the Fayette-Nicholas County border.

Dams
In Nicholas County, the Gauley is impounded by the Summersville Dam, a U.S. Army Corps of Engineers dam, to form Summersville Lake.  The Gauley River National Recreation Area is downstream of the dam.

Whitewater paddling

The Gauley is run year-round by recreational boaters and from spring to fall by commercial rafting companies. During the majority of the year, boating is dependent on water level, which fluctuates dramatically depending on rainfall and the level of Summersville Lake. However, starting the Friday after Labor Day, the Army Corps of Engineers provides a series of twenty-two controlled releases for the express purpose of downriver recreation. These releases are collectively known as "Gauley Season" and are scheduled on six successive weekends, the first five of which are four-day weekends (Friday through Monday) and the last of which is just Saturday and Sunday. Typical release levels during "Gauley Season" range from 2,400 to 2,800 ft³/s (68 to 79 m³/s).

These releases are the result of an act of the U.S. Congress, the first law passed in the U.S. to specifically mandate recreational whitewater dam releases. The releases bring millions of dollars annually to the local economy, as paddlers travel from all over the United States and overseas for this event.

History
The Gauley area was the site of the Battle of Carnifex Ferry on September 10, 1861, a Union victory in the American Civil War.

Name

The Gauley River's name most likely is derived from Gaul (literally "river of the Gauls"), a historical region of Europe including most of current day France, from the time when West Virginia was part of New France before the French and Indian War.

Historically, the river has had various Indian names, variant spellings of Gaul/Gauley as well as Falling/Falls Creek.

See also
List of West Virginia rivers

References

External links
Gauley River National Recreation Area
US Army Corps of Engineers: Southern WV
Weather And Water Levels
 

Rivers of West Virginia
Tributaries of the Kanawha River
Monongahela National Forest
Rivers of Fayette County, West Virginia
Rivers of Randolph County, West Virginia
Rivers of Nicholas County, West Virginia
Rivers of Webster County, West Virginia